Orophia ferrugella is a species of moth in the family Depressariidae. It was described by Michael Denis and Ignaz Schiffermüller in 1775. It is found in most of Europe, except Ireland, Great Britain, the Netherlands, Portugal, Ukraine, Slovenia, and Greece.

The wingspan is 12–16 mm. Adults are on wing from May to August in one generation per year.

The larvae feed on Campanula persicifolia. The larvae mine the leaves of their host plant. The mine has the form of a full-depth blotch, running parallel to the midrib. A single larva makes several mines. Frass is only found in the first mine. Older larvae live free in tube made of a leaf. Larvae are found in spring.

References

External links
Lepiforum.de

Moths described in 1775
Orophia
Moths of Europe